Maddison Sunshine Al-Jaizani (born 3 June 1995) is an English actress and model. She is known for her roles as Sophie de Clermont in the Canal+ series Versailles (2015–2018), Odessa in the AMC series Into the Badlands (2017–2019), and Bess Marvin in the CW series Nancy Drew (2019–).

Early life
Jaizani was born in London to an English mother and an Iranian father and grew up in Sale, Greater Manchester. She attended Sir John Deane's College for sixth form. She completed a BTEC Extended Diploma in performing arts at Bury College in 2014.

Career
Jaizani made her television debut as teenage Leila (played by Moran Atias as an adult) in the 2014 episode "State of Emergency" of the FX political drama Tyrant. From 2015 to 2018, Jaizani starred as Sophie de Clermont, later Duchesse de Cassel, in the Canal+ and BBC Two historical drama Versailles. She had a recurring role as Odessa in latter two seasons of the AMC series Into the Badlands. In March 2019, Jaizani was cast as Bess in The CW mystery series Nancy Drew.

In 2020, Jaizani signed with Elite Model Management.

Filmography

References

External links
 
 Maddison Jaizani at Spotlight
 
 

Living people
1995 births
Actresses from Manchester
British actresses of Asian descent
English female models
English people of Iranian descent
English television actresses
People educated at Sir John Deane's College
People from the Royal Borough of Kensington and Chelsea
People from Sale, Greater Manchester